Rayvonte Rice (born July 14, 1992) is an American professional basketball player for Taichung Suns of the T1 League. He is a guard from Champaign, Illinois who completed his college career at the University of Illinois at Urbana-Champaign. He previously played at Drake University in Des Moines, Iowa from 2010–2012 and transferred after his sophomore season.

High school
During his junior season at Centennial High School in Champaign, Rice led the Chargers to the 2009 3A IHSA Boys Basketball Championship with a 61-59 defeat over Oswego High School. During his senior season, Rice averaged 23.9 points, 6.4 rebounds, 2.9 steals and 1.8 assists and led his team back to the IHSA state tournament for a fourth-place finish. After his senior season in 2010, Rice came in second with 201 votes for Illinois Mr. Basketball behind Jereme Richmond. Ironically, Richmond committed to play at the University of Illinois while Rice was never offered a scholarship by then coach, Bruce Weber. Richmond only stayed at Illinois for one season, and Coach John Groce offered Rice a scholarship to transfer from Drake after his sophomore season.

Rice was named a member of the 2010 Illinois All-American Team as selected by the Associated Press, Chicago Tribune, Chicago Sun-Times, News-Gazette, and the Illinois Basketball Coaches Association. He was also named the 2010 News-Gazette All-State Player of the Year, the first from Champaign–Urbana metropolitan area since 1984.

Rice left Centennial High School as the all-time leading scorer in both school history and in Champaign-Urbana high school prep history with 1,810 career points.

College career

Freshman
During his first year at Drake, Rice made an immediate impact, playing in 31 games and averaging 13.8 ppg and shooting an average of just over 40% from the field. For his contributions to his team, Rice was voted to the 2011 Missouri Valley Conference All-Freshman Team & the All-Newcomers Team.

Sophomore
Rice improved his second year at Drake averaging 16.8 ppg and shooting about 44% from the field. Rice was named to the 2012 Second-Team Missouri Valley Conference following the season.

After announcing his decision to transfer from Drake, Rice narrowed down his options between Illinois, Xavier, Memphis, and Marquette. Rice said of his decision to sign with Illinois, that John Groce had previously recruited him while Groce was still coach at Ohio University which contributed to his commitment.

Due to NCAA transfer rules, Rice was forced to sit out during the 2012-2013 season. The transfer regulations relegated Rice to attend only practices as a participant and home games at the State Farm Center as an observer. Rice has gained much notoriety for his transfer year as he made drastic changes to his workouts & diet, which resulted in him losing 45 pounds and cutting his overall body fat to 5%.

Junior
During the 2013-2014 season has been twice named Big Ten Player of the Week. As of January 3, 2014 Rice is leading the conference in scoring, averaging 19 ppg.

Senior
In the early season games, Rice won the Las Vegas Tournament MVP. During the 2014 year Rice improved his shooting 44% from three point line, improving from 29% the previous season. Ray had a major impact on the Braggin Rights game where he hit a step back game winning jumper as time expired. He showed his athleticism when he threw down a massive alley-oop dunk vs Purdue. Despite missing some games in the middle of the season due to injury, and having a lower average of minutes per game, he improved his field goal percentage by 4%, his three-point percentage by 14%, as previously noted, raised his free throw to 80%, and averaged more rebounds, steals, assists, and points in his senior campaign compared to his junior year. He ranked 5th in the big ten in scoring (unofficially since he missed games due to injury, and the Big Ten website accounts for players playing most of the games), and 9th in rebounding (also unofficially for the same reason). He won Co-Most Outstanding Player for the Illini tied with teammate Nnanna Egwu.

College statistics

|-
| style="text-align:left;"| 2010–11
| style="text-align:left;"| Drake
| 31 || 30 || 30.1 || 40.2 || 29.5 || 69.6 || 4.8 || 1.6 || 1.4 || 0.8 || 13.8
|-
| style="text-align:left;"| 2011–12
| style="text-align:left;"| Drake
| 33 || 33 || 33.4 || 43.6 || 24.1 || 70.8 || 5.8 || 1.6 || 1.9 || 0.8 || 16.8
|-
| style="text-align:left;"| 2012–13
| style="text-align:left;"| Illinois
| style="text-align:center;" colspan="11"|Did not play due to NCAA transfer regulations
|-
| style="text-align:left;"| 2013–14
| style="text-align:left;"| Illinois
| 35 || 35 || 32.7 || 43.0 || 29.5 || 73.1 || 6.0 || 1.5 || 1.7 || 0.3 || 15.9
|-
| style="text-align:left;"| 2014–15
| style="text-align:left;"| Illinois
| 24 || 19 || 30.0 || 47.1 || 43.6 || 80.7 || 6.5 || 1.8 || 1.8 || 0.3 || 16.5

Updated: January 12, 2018

Professional career
Rice signed his first professional contract with Tezenis Verona of the Italian Serie A2 Basket on July 29, 2015. Rice spent the 2017-18 season with Basket Ravenna Piero Manetti in Italy. He averaged 18.7 points and 6.3 rebounds per game in 30 games. On September 25, 2018, he signed with Petrochimi Bandar Imam BC of the Iranian Basketball Super League. In July 2019, Rice played with the Phoenix Suns during the 2019 NBA Summer League.

On September 4, 2019, Rice  signed with Avtodor Saratov of the VTB United League. On December 25, 2019, Rice parted ways with Saratov to join Hapoel Eilat of the Israeli Premier League for the rest of the season. He signed with Kyoto Hannaryz of the Japanese B.League on July 15, 2020.

After training with AEK Athens for a period of time, Rice eventually signed with Ionikos Nikaias of the Greek Basket League, on December 10, 2021. On January 8, 2022, Rice mutually parted ways with the Greek club in order to pursue a G League contract. In only 2 games, he averaged 12.5 points and 3 rebounds, playing 21 minutes per contest.

Salt Lake City Stars (2022)
On January 8, 2022, Rice was acquired via waivers by the Salt Lake City Stars.

Taichung Suns (2023–present)
On February 10, 2023, Rice signed with the Taichung Suns of the T1 League.

Personal life
Rice has been quoted as saying he idolized former Fighting Illini basketball stars Dee Brown, Deron Williams, Luther Head, and Corey Bradford while growing up in Champaign.

While in high school, Rice was a dual-sport athlete who backed up his cousin Mikel Leshoure as running back for the Centennial Chargers. Leshoure went on to play football for the Fighting Illini and then was drafted in the 2nd round of the 2011 NFL Draft by the Detroit Lions.

References

External links
Illinois Fighting Illini bio
FIBA Profile
RealGM profile
College statistics

1992 births
Living people
21st-century African-American sportspeople
African-American basketball players
American expatriate basketball people in France
American expatriate basketball people in Greece
American expatriate basketball people in Iran
American expatriate basketball people in Israel
American expatriate basketball people in Italy
American expatriate basketball people in Japan
American expatriate basketball people in Mexico
American expatriate basketball people in Russia
Aix Maurienne Savoie Basket players
American men's basketball players
Basketball players from Illinois
BC Avtodor Saratov players
Drake Bulldogs men's basketball players
Hapoel Eilat basketball players
Illinois Fighting Illini men's basketball players
Ionikos Nikaias B.C. players
Kyoto Hannaryz players
Petrochimi Bandar Imam BC players
Salt Lake City Stars players
Scaligera Basket Verona players
Shooting guards
Soles de Mexicali players
Sportspeople from Champaign, Illinois
Taichung Suns players
T1 League imports